Alice Di Micele is a folk musician and environmental singer and songwriter from Ashland, Oregon.

Early life

Alice Di Micele grew up in New Jersey to a pianist mother and a school teacher father, and received her initial formal musical training in voice and on the recorder, flute, and guitar in Linden Public Schools and SUNY New Paltz. Throughout these early years she was active in several popular, short-lived, local bands; but began seriously focusing on acoustic guitar as an accomplished musician and cultural activist while moving to Southern Oregon.

Career

In Oregon, Di Micele founded her own Independent record label, Alice Otter Music, to promote not only her own music but also that of other marginalized folk artists. The label released her first album in 1988, which included a song she wrote when she was 11 years old called "Celebrate the Rain". Di Micele has received rave reviews and has performed at many festivals, benefits, and venues. She has released 16 albums on her own label and is a part of 5 compilations.

Many of the themes of her recordings reflect her environmental, LGBT, and anti-war interests.

Her work has been analyzed to advance music therapy, outdoor education, and ethnomusicology. 

Di Micele also released a children's album If I Were an Otter: Songs for Kids of All Ages to critical acclaim. Called "a pure delight" by the roots music journal No Depression, the recording features 13 original and classic folk songs including "City Mouse/Country Mouse", a duet with Vince Herman.

Her song "Chinook Blues" on her Alice Live album provided the backdrop to the video Source to Sea: the Columbia River Swim about the declining native salmon population in the Pacific Northwest ecosystem.

Her fundraising activities throughout her career have involved Open Source and Copyleft underground access to her digitized audio concerts and other works. She remains a composer and activist using the arts to inform audiences of issues related to climate change, including the wild fires devastating the Anglo and Latinx residents on the west coast.  She has been involved in fundraising efforts for some of the hardest hit communities.  Before the fires, she worked for decades to organize local, national, and international concerts and other community efforts bringing together artistic, cultural, financial, and other resources to help those in need.

Discography

Solo recordings
Make a Change (1988)
It's a Miracle (1989)
Too Controversial (1990)
Searching (1992)
Naked (1994)
Demons & Angels (1998)
Alice Live (2000)
Live at the Strawberry Music Festival (2001)
RAW, UNFILTERED, ORGANIC (2006)
by ebb & by flow (2007)
Lucky Dogs (2011)
If I Were an Otter: Songs for Kids of All Ages (2013)
Swim (2015)
One With the Tide (2018)
Live at Studio E (2019)
Every Seed We Plant (2022)

Compilations
In the Spirit of Crazy Horse: Songs for Leonard Peltier (1989)
If A Tree Falls (1994, EarthBeat!)
Circle of Life (1997)
One Land One Heart (1998)

Collaborations
Petty Thievery
Circle of Women (1997, Rhino Records)

References

External links

1965 births
Living people
American environmentalists
American women environmentalists
American women singer-songwriters
American folk singers
Feminist musicians
American lesbian musicians
Musicians from Ashland, Oregon
People from Elizabeth, New Jersey
Writers from Ashland, Oregon
Singer-songwriters from New Jersey
Singer-songwriters from Oregon
Guitarists from Oregon
Guitarists from New Jersey
20th-century American guitarists
20th-century American women guitarists
20th-century American LGBT people
21st-century LGBT people
21st-century American women guitarists